Jay Litherland (born August 24, 1995) is an American competition swimmer of both Japanese and New Zealand descent. He represents DC Trident which is part of the International Swimming League. He won the silver medal in the Men's 400 Individual Medley at the 2020 Tokyo Olympics in a time of 4:10.28. He was a World University Games gold medalist at the 2015 Summer Universiade and a bronze medalist at the FINA World Junior Swimming Championships. Litherland competed for the University of Georgia in American collegiate swimming.

Early life

Litherland was born in Osaka, Japan as a triplet, along with brothers Mick and Kevin. His father, Andrew Litherland, is a chef from New Zealand, and his mother, Chizuko, is from Japan. He grew up speaking Japanese at home. The family settled in Johns Creek, Georgia, and Litherland was named an All-American in swimming while he was a student at Chattahoochee High School. Litherland and his brothers grew up swimming at Dynamo Swim Club in Atlanta, and each attended and competed as swimmers at the University of Georgia.

Litherland received U.S. citizenship in high school. As a triple citizen of Japan, New Zealand, and the United States, he had the option of competing for any of the those three countries at the Olympics. He originally contacted the New Zealand swimming federation with interest in competing for them for the 2016 Olympics, but he had already competed for the U.S. at an international event, meaning he would have required special permission to switch to New Zealand. His brothers decided to participate in the New Zealand Olympic trials instead of the U.S. trials, which left Litherland "kind of bummed that I'm not representing New Zealand with them, but I'm really excited for them." His brothers ended up not making the New Zealand team, so all three competed in the U.S. trials together.

College Career: University of Georgia

International career

2015 World University Games 
At the 2015 Summer Universiade in Gwangju, Litherland won gold in the 400-meter IM, out-splitting compatriot Josh Prenot by 3 seconds on the freestyle leg to overtake him with a time of 4:12.43.

2016 U.S. Olympic Trials 
At the 2016 United States Olympic Trials, Litherland qualified for his first Olympic team by placing second in the 400-meter IM behind his Georgia teammate Chase Kalisz in a time of 4:11.02.

2016 Rio Olympics 
At the 2016 Summer Olympics, Litherland placed 5th in the 400-meter IM with a time of 4:11.68.

2017 National Championships/World Championship Trials 
At the 2017 USA Swimming Championships, Litherland placed 2nd in the 400-meter IM with a time of 4:09.31, qualifying him to swim the event at that year's World Championships. He also finished 5th in the 200-meter IM, 9th in the 400-meter freestyle, and 7th in the 200-meter freestyle.

2017 World Championships 
At the [[2017 themagazinemodule.com|2017 FINA World Championships]], Litherland placed 5th in the 400-meter IM in a time of 4:12.05. He also swam in the heats of the 4x200-meter themagazinemodule.com, and earned his first World Championship medal, a bronze, when the US team placed 3rd in the final.

2018 U.S. National Championships 
At the 2018 USA Swimming Championships, Litherland swam a time of 4:10.21 in the 400-meter IM to placed 2nd. He also finished 6th in the 200-meter IM and 7th in the 200-meter freestyle.

2019 World Championships 
Jay's only event at the 2019 World Aquatics Championships was on the final day. With Teammate Chase Kalisz failing to make the final, Jay Litherland was the only American in the 400 IM Final.  Sitting 3.34 Seconds behind the leader Daiya Seto at the 300 mark, Litherland closed the gap to 0.27, placing 2nd and gaining him his first individual World Championship medal.

ISL – DC Trident

2020 Tokyo Olympics 
In the 400 meter individual medley Litherland closed strongly to win the silver medal in a time of 4:10.28. He outtouched bronze medalist Brendon Smith by one-tenth of a second.

Career best times

Long course (50-meter pool)

References

External links
 
 
 
 
 
 

1995 births
Living people
American male medley swimmers
American people of New Zealand descent
American sportspeople of Japanese descent
Olympic swimmers of the United States
Swimmers from Atlanta
Swimmers at the 2016 Summer Olympics
Universiade medalists in swimming
World Aquatics Championships medalists in swimming
Universiade gold medalists for the United States
Medalists at the 2015 Summer Universiade
Olympic silver medalists for the United States in swimming
Georgia Bulldogs men's swimmers
Medalists at the 2020 Summer Olympics
Swimmers at the 2020 Summer Olympics
Triplets
21st-century American people